Can't Fight the Midnight is the debut and only solo album by American singer Jimmy Harnen, lead singer of the band Synch, which was released in 1989. It contains the hit power ballad, "Where Are You Now".

Track listing 
 "Hello" (4:16)
 "When the Midnight Comes" (4:27)
 "If She Cries" (5:14)
 "All Those Tears" (3:51)
 "Little Nikki" (3:52)
 "I Don't Mind" (3:57)
 "No Reason in the World" (4:22)
 "Southern Lady" (3:50)
 "For All the Wrong Reasons" (4:25)
 "Boy in Love" (3:54)
 "Where Are You Now" (4:29)

1989 debut albums
Jimmy Harnen albums